Bagarkot    is a village development committee in south-west of Dadeldhura District in the Sudurpashchim Province of western Nepal. The population is about 6025 according to the  census of 2008. At the time of the 1991 Nepal census it had a population of 3658 people living in 620 individual households.

References

External links
UN map of the municipalities of  Dadeldhura District

Populated places in Dadeldhura District